John H. McBryde (October 9, 1931 – December 25, 2022) was an American lawyer who served as a United States district judge of the United States District Court for the Northern District of Texas from 1990 to 2022.

Education and career
McBryde was born in Jackson, Mississippi, on October 9, 1931. He received a Bachelor of Science degree from Texas Christian University in 1953. He received a Bachelor of Laws from the University of Texas School of Law in 1956. He was in private practice in Fort Worth from 1956 to 1990.

Federal judicial service
McBryde was nominated by President George H. W. Bush on May 11, 1990, to a seat on the United States District Court for the Northern District of Texas vacated by Judge Eldon B. Mahon. He was confirmed by the United States Senate on August 3, 1990, and received his commission on August 7, 1990. He assumed senior status on October 9, 2018.

Fifth Circuit sanctions
On December 31, 1997, the Judicial Council of the Fifth Circuit Court of the United States issued an order sanctioning Judge McBryde for conduct prejudicial to the effective administration of the business of the courts.

Personal life and death
McBryde died on December 25, 2022, at the age of 91.

References

External links

 FCI Fort Worth Inmate Charged in Murder-for-Hire Plot Against Federal Judge

1931 births
2022 deaths
20th-century American judges
21st-century American judges
Judges of the United States District Court for the Northern District of Texas
Lawyers from Jackson, Mississippi
Texas Christian University alumni
United States district court judges appointed by George H. W. Bush
University of Texas School of Law alumni